Khaled Al-Ansari (Arabic: خالد الأنصاري) (born 4 January 1989) is a Qatari footballer who plays as a midfielder .

External links
 

Qatari footballers
1989 births
Living people
Al Ahli SC (Doha) players
Qatar SC players
Al-Shamal SC players
Qatar Stars League players
Qatari Second Division players
Association football midfielders